Beach Airport  is a public airport located one mile (1.6 km) east-northeast of the central business district of Beach, in Golden Valley County, North Dakota, United States. It is owned by the Golden Valley County Airport Authority.

Facilities and aircraft

For the 12-month period ending December 31, 2006, the airport had 1,670 aircraft operations: 96% general aviation, 4% air taxi, and less than 1% military.

References

External links

Airports in North Dakota
Buildings and structures in Golden Valley County, North Dakota
Transportation in Golden Valley County, North Dakota